The 1936 Argentine Primera División was the 45th season of top-flight football in Argentina. Two regular championships were disputed that year, "Copa de Honor" (won by San Lorenzo) and "Copa Campeonato" (won by River Plate).

At the end of the season, both champions, River and San Lorenzo, played a single match for the "Copa de Oro" trophy. River Plate won the match, that would be recognised as an additional league title.

Final tables

Copa de Honor

Copa Campeonato

Copa de Oro

Trophy disputed by both champions of the two competitions contested that year, San Lorenzo (Copa de Honor) and River Plate (Copa Campeonato). In June 2013 (77 years after the match was played) the AFA cited on its website the "Copa de Oro" as a league title for River Plate. The "Copa de Honor" was also included as a league title for San Lorenzo de Almagro.

Nevertheless, some historians consider the "Copa de Oro" a domestic cup title, instead of a league championship, stating that this cup was only contested to qualify an Argentine representative to play the Copa Aldao against the Uruguayan champion. Otherwise, the AFA's Memoria y Balance 1936 (Annual Report) cited River Plate as "Campeón 1936" mentioning both titles won, Copa de Oro and Copa Campeonato, while San Lorenzo is only mentioned as "Copa de Honor winner".

Details

References

a
p
Argentine Primera División seasons
p
p